The 2005 Silverstone GP2 Series round was a GP2 Series motor race held on 9 and 10 July 2005 at Silverstone Circuit, United Kingdom. It was the sixth round of the 2005 GP2 Series season. The race weekend supported the 2005 British Grand Prix.

Nico Rosberg, who was the polesitter for race one, took his first GP2 feature race win, his second consecutive victory after also winning the sprint race at Magny-Cours. The feature race podium was completed by championship leader Heikki Kovalainen, of Arden International, and Rosberg's ART Grand Prix teammate Alexandre Prémat.

Olivier Pla, who was on reverse grid pole after finishing eighth in the feature race, took his and David Price Racing's first win of the season, ahead of iSport's Scott Speed and Kovalainen.

Classification

Qualifying

Notes
 — Alexandre Prémat and Ernesto Viso were given ten-place grid penalties for incidents at Magny-Cours.

Feature race

Sprint race

Standings after the round

Drivers' Championship standings

Teams' Championship standings

 Note: Only the top five positions are included for both sets of standings.

References

Silverstone
GP2